The men's pole vault at the 2016 IAAF World Indoor Championships took place on March 17, 2016.

The men's and women's pole vault competition were the only events on the opening day.  They were conducted simultaneously with two parallel runways down the center of the arena.  The runways were at floor level, unlike the more common raised runways which is a more dangerous situation; one which resulted in the injury to Renaud Lavillenie minutes after setting the world record two years earlier.  It was that injury that prevented Lavillenie from defending his world indoor title at the previous championship, but he was back this year with the world leading jump going into the competition.

Of the 14 competitors, six had already left the competition before Lavillenie even bothered to make his first attempt at 5.75, 2 hours into the competition.  All of the competitors in this field had cleared 5.75, most of them this season, but no other had the confidence to wait until 5.75 for their opening height.  Piotr Lisek had already cleared the height, but he already had a miss earlier in the competition, so with his easy clearance, shrugging before landing in the pit, Lavillenie was immediately in the lead.  Jan Kudlička and Shawn Barber struggled to clear on their third attempt.  That would be the best those other jumpers would achieve.  Sam Kendricks was still perfect in the competition to that point but had sat out 5.75.  He remained perfect at 5.80 to take the lead while Lavillenie confidently passed and the others failed.  Kendricks failed at his first attempt at 5.85, Barber and Lisek also saved one heroic attempt for 5.85, while Lavillenie remained on the sidelines.  Kendricks then passed to 5.90 and failed again.  Lavillenie then picked up his pole, almost 45 minutes after his first attempt and cleared the bar in only his second attempt of the evening.  Kendricks took one final attempt to stay in the competition but had to settle for silver.  Lavillenie continued, moving the bar to 6.02 he rattled the bar on his way down but it stayed on the pegs and he remained perfect in the competition.  Lavillenie then had the bar raised another half a foot to world record height , though none of the attempts were close.

Records

Qualification standards

Schedule

Results
The final was started at 19:05.

References

Pole vault
Pole vault at the World Athletics Indoor Championships